María Belén is a Mexican children's telenovela produced by Mapat L. de Zatarain for Televisa. It aired on Canal de las Estrellas from August 13, 2001 to December 14, 2001, and starred Nora Salinas, Rene Lavan, and Danna Paola.

Plot
María Belén is a six-year-old girl who recently lost her adoptive parents in a tragic accident. She has stayed with her uncle Rogelio, an ambitious and evil man, who planned this accident to take over the inheritance of his half brother Alfonso García Marín, but he did not take into account the possibility that María Belén escaped unharmed from the catastrophe and, much less, that she was just the universal heir of Alfonso's assets. That is why now Rogelio has to hide the girl to fulfill his goal. María Belén arrives as a student at the Brighton Institute, a place run by Úrsula Arana, because Rogelio manages to convince her with money to keep her living there, promising that he will return later for her, although those are not his true intentions. Ursula is a bitter and malicious woman who has had to work in that place to maintain her social position, but in no way enjoys the company of girls. Her arrival at the Brighton Institute marks the fate of María Belén, because right there she will meet her real father: Pablo Díaz Cortázar.

Six years ago, when Pablo was still studying and, at the same time, working to maintain his studies, he met a beautiful girl named Alejandra Medrano. Both fell in love and, although they established a sweet and simple relationship, this had to end because Pablo received a scholarship abroad to increase his studies. Alejandra was the one who most convinced Pablo to take that opportunity, seeing disinterestedly for the benefit of her beloved without knowing that in those moments she was pregnant with a child from him. Pablo left, not knowing that later on Alejandra would give birth to a beautiful girl and die shortly after giving birth. This is how María Belén was adopted by the García Marín family. Pablo managed to find out about this situation once he returned to Mexico, but unfortunately for him there was no information that could take him to his daughter. In the present, he has been desperately looking for the little girl for four years, without success. Now, the only thing that brings happiness to his life is Ana del Río, his current girlfriend, a sweet and loving woman who works as a psychologist at the Brighton Institute.

Úrsula Arana has lived for many years obsessed with the love of Pablo Díaz Cortázar, who, ever since he worked in a newspaper under the orders of her father, always rejected her. The newspaper went bankrupt and Ursula lost track of Pablo, but not her obsession with him. It is now when Úrsula, without knowing it, has the possibility of giving Pablo what he most desires in his life: to find his little daughter, María Belén. María Belén does not know that she has a father who seeks her, but her need to have a family will grow along with the evils and tricks that Úrsula constantly commits against her. Even in a situation so adverse to her young age, María Belén has a cheerful and positive character that will allow her to make great friends that will help her to fill her life with love.

Cast

Main 
 Nora Salinas as Ana del Río
 Rene Lavan as Pablo Díaz Cortázar
 Maya Mishalska as Úrsula Araña
 Antonio Medellín as Refugio "Don Cuco"
 Harry Geithner as Rogelio García Marín
 Xavier Marc as Adolfo Serrano
 Luis Xavier as Antonio Sanz
 Danna Paola as María Belén
 Marcela Páez as Claudia del Río
 María Marcela as Lucrecia Campos
 Dacia Arcaráz as Malena Cataño
 Alejandra Barros as Valeria Montaño de Sanz
 Yurem Rojas as Bruno Sanz Montaño
 Mónica Prado as Hilda Manríquez de Serrano
 Graciela Bernardos as Trinidad Gutiérrez
 Héctor Parra as Raúl Trujillo
 Cristiane Aguinaga as Deborah Tamargo
 Irina Wilkins as Romina Cortés Mena
 Natush as Evelyn
 Marijose Valverde as Socorro
 René Casados as Jorge
 Patricio Borghetti as Ángel

Recurring 
 Mariana Karr as Lolita
 Antonio Escobar as Ramiro Benegas
 Miguel Priego as Félix Gamez
 Elizabeth Arciniega as Lic. Laura Paola Rocha
 Jorge Ortín as José Zaragoza "Pepe"
 Evelyn Solares as Camila
 Oscar Ferretti as Aurelio Suárez
 Hanny Sáenz as Montserrat
 Arturo Barba as Polo
 Yousi Díaz as Norma Malpica
 Adriana Laffan as Margarita
 Gustavo Negrete as Gastón
 Sara Monar as Mercedes
 Eugenia Avendaño as Eduviges
 Mariana Sánchez as Gloria
 Paulina Martell as Pirueta
 Esteban Franco as Fidelio
 Rebeca Manríquez as Gabriela
 Benjamín Islas as Tiburcio
 Claudia Elisa Aguilar as Rosa

Guest stars 
 Mary Paz Banquells as Patricia Pineda de García
 Alfredo Adame as Alfonso García Marín

External links
 
 

2001 telenovelas
2001 Mexican television series debuts
2001 Mexican television series endings
Mexican children's television series
Mexican telenovelas
Children's telenovelas
Spanish-language telenovelas
Televisa telenovelas
Television series about orphans